The 2004 United States presidential election in California took place on November 2, 2004, and was part of the 2004 United States presidential election. Voters chose 55 representatives, or electors to the Electoral College, who voted for president and vice president.

California was won by Democratic nominee John Kerry by a 9.95% margin of victory. Prior to the election, all 12 news organizations considered this a state Kerry would win, or otherwise considered as a safe blue state. Republican presidential candidates have not taken California's electoral votes since Bush's father George H. W. Bush in his victory over Michael Dukakis in 1988. Bush would become the first and only Republican to win two terms in the White House without winning California at least once. With its 55 electoral votes, California was John Kerry's biggest electoral prize in 2004.

This is the only election since 1880 in which the Republican nominee won the nationwide popular vote without California. As well as the first time since 1976 it voted for the popular vote loser, and the only time a Republican was elected twice without winning California either time. 

As of the 2020 presidential election, this is the last time a Republican presidential candidate received more than 40% of the vote in California, where the margin of victory was in single digits, and where the Democratic Party failed to obtain at least 60% of the vote. Bush remains the last Republican candidate to win the following counties in a presidential election: Fresno, Merced, Riverside, San Bernardino, San Diego, San Joaquin, San Luis Obispo, Stanislaus, and Ventura, and also the last candidate of any party to win Butte County by a majority. This was also the only time since 1960 that California voted for a different presidential candidate than nearby New Mexico. It also remains the last presidential election that a Republican won more than a third of the vote in Los Angeles County and also the last time that the gap between the Republican and Democratic candidates was less than two million votes.

Primaries
 2004 California Democratic presidential primary
 2004 California Republican presidential primary

Campaign

Predictions
There were 12 news organizations who made state-by-state predictions of the election. Here are their last predictions before election day.

Polling

Kerry led every single pre-election poll. The final 3 polls average Kerry leading at 52% to Bush at 43% to Nader at 2%.

Fundraising
Bush raised $20,296,645, the second most money raised state for him. It accounted for 10.7% of all the money he raised in 2004. Kerry raised $36,378,063, which is by far the most money raised for Kerry by any state. The money raised in California accounted for almost 20% of all money he raised in 2004.

Advertising and visits
Neither Kerry nor Bush advertised or campaigned in the state during the fall election.

Analysis

California was once a Republican leaning swing state, supporting Republican candidates in every election from 1952 through 1988, except in 1964. However, since the 1990s, California has become a reliably Democratic state with a highly diverse ethnic population (mostly Latino) and liberal bastions such as the San Francisco Bay Area and Los Angeles County. The last time the state was won by a Republican candidate was in 1988 by George H. W. Bush.

In 2004, the state did swing slightly Republican by a 1.9% margin from 2000 due to strong swings in heavily populated San Diego, Orange, Riverside, San Bernardino, Ventura, Kern, Fresno, Stanislaus, and San Joaquin counties, in all of which Bush increased his margin by substantially more than he did nationally, and all of which save San Diego, San Joaquin, and Ventura he won by double digits. Bush also won over a million votes in Los Angeles County, the most populous county in the United States; and he held Kerry to a 0.2% margin in Sacramento County (which Gore had won by 4.0%). Bush also benefited from strong support by Arnold Schwarzenegger, the state's Republican governor. These factors likely contributed to California being closer than expected in 2004.

Nonetheless, this proved the first time the Democratic Party had won remote Alpine County since 1936 and only the third in that county’s 140-year electoral history, and the first time the Democratic nominee carried neighboring Mono County since 1940, and only the seventh since that county was formed in 1861; Bush thus became the first ever Republican to win the White House without carrying the former county, and the first to do so without carrying the latter county since William McKinley in 1896. Kerry further countered Bush's improved performance in Southern California and the Central Valley with large swings towards the Democratic Party in Northern California and the Central Coast. He improved on Al Gore's vote share by over 5% in Alameda, Sonoma, Marin, Santa Barbara, and San Mateo Counties, and in the city of San Francisco; and by over 10% in Santa Cruz County; he also improved on Gore by nearly 5% in San Luis Obispo County, although he didn't succeed in flipping it. In San Francisco, he became the first presidential nominee of any party in at least over a century to crack 80%, as Bush's vote share dipped below not only what he had gotten in 2000, but below Dole's in 1996.

Results

By county

Counties that flipped from Republican to Democratic
 Alpine (largest municipality: Markleeville)
 Mono (largest municipality: Mammoth Lakes)

By congressional district
Kerry won 31 of 53 congressional districts. Bush won 22 congressional districts, including two districts held by Democrats.

Electors

Technically the voters of California cast their ballots for electors: representatives to the Electoral College. California is allocated 55 electors because it has 53 congressional districts and 2 senators. All candidates who appear on the ballot or qualify to receive write-in votes must submit a list of 53 electors, who pledge to vote for their candidate and his or her running mate. Whoever wins the majority of votes in the state is awarded all 53 electoral votes. Their chosen electors then vote for president and vice president. Although electors are pledged to their candidate and running mate, they are not obligated to vote for them. An elector who votes for someone other than his or her candidate is known as a faithless elector.

The electors of each state and the District of Columbia met on December 13, 2004, to cast their votes for president and vice president. The Electoral College itself never meets as one body. Instead the electors from each state and the District of Columbia met in their respective capitols.

The following were the members of the Electoral College from California. All were pledged to and voted for John Kerry and John Edwards.

 Robert H. Manley
 Barbara Schraeger
 Paul Johnson
 Gary Simmons
 Paul Batterson
 Diana Madoshi
 Kyriakos Tsakopoulos
 Donald Linker
 Paula Sandusky
 Adam Woo
 Chloe Drew
 Karl Sliferv
 Gary Prost
 Joseph Cotchett
 John Smith
 George Marcus
 Mark Hsu
 Adele Bihn
 Darrell Darling
 Amarjit Dhaliwal
 Rocco Davis
 Kenneth Costa
 Barbara Pyle
 David Johnson 
 Andrew M. Siegel
 Michael Carpenter
 Lynda Von Husen
 Randy Monroe 
 Lane M. Sherman
 Moreen Blum 
 Yolanda Dyer
 Paul I. Goldenberg
 Lenore Wax
 Mitch O'Farrell
 Franklin A. Acevedo
 Gwen Moore
 Pedro Carillo
 Karen Walters
 Ted Lieu
 Valerie McDonald
 Marvin
 Douglas E. Hitchcock
 Barbara Kerr 
 Salvador Sanchez
Joe Baca, Jr.
 Grant Gruber
 James T. Ewing
 Louise Giacoppe
 James G. Bohm 
 Mark Lam 
 Chuck Lower
 Susan Koehler 
 Mary Salas
 Andrew Benjamin 
 Margaret Lawrence

References

California
2004
2004 California elections